Mask in Blue is a 1953 West German musical film directed by Georg Jacoby and starring Marika Rökk, Paul Hubschmid and Wilfried Seyferth.

It is an operetta film based on the stage work of the same name composed by Fred Raymond. A previous film version was made in 1943.

It was made at the Bavaria Studios in Munich and on location in Rome. The film's sets were designed by the art director Erich Kettelhut. It was shot in Agfacolor.

Cast
Marika Rökk as Juliska Varady
Paul Hubschmid as Armando Cellini
Wilfried Seyferth as Orgando, Manager
Walter Müller as Seppl Frauenhofer
Ernst Waldow as Police Inspector Lamento
Annie Rosar as Birri, Wardrobe Mistress
Fritz Odemar as Theatre Director Corelli
 as Putti Pierotti
Rudolf Schündler as Stage Manager
Peter W. Staub as Wat Nu, Chinese Servant
Ulrich Bettac
 as Singer

References

External links

1953 musical films
German musical films
West German films
Films directed by Georg Jacoby
Films based on operettas
Operetta films
Films shot at Bavaria Studios
Remakes of German films
Films scored by Fred Raymond
1950s German films